Keron Toussaint (born 10 February 1989) is a Grenadian sprinter who competes in the 100 metres and 200 metres. He represented Grenada in the 2011 Pan American Games) and suffered an injury during the semi finals of the men's 400 thus resulting with a time of 1:37.36 and a rank of 23rd. He has since attempted to be a part of the Grenadian Olympic team for the 2012 and 2016 without success.

International competitions

References

External links

Living people
1989 births
Grenadian male sprinters
Kansas Jayhawks men's track and field athletes
Pan American Games competitors for Grenada
Athletes (track and field) at the 2011 Pan American Games